Frank J. Christensen (born April 17, 1961) is an American labor leader who is the general president of the International Union of Elevator Constructors. He was the longest-serving business manager of Elevator Constructors Local 2 in its history. and was the Chairman of the Illinois Elevator Safety Board from its inception in 2003 to 2013.

Early life and education 
A native Chicagoan, he grew up on the southwest side and graduated from Bogan High School in 1979. While at Bogan he was an All-State wrestler and earned a wrestling scholarship to the University of Illinois. Christensen has attended Iowa State University, the University of Wisconsin, Chicago-Kent College of Law and the National Labor College. Wrestling wasn't his only area of studies. Christensen started his studies of Martial Arts under Grand Master Joon Ha Lee (Oaklawn, Illinois) and became a Blackbelt. His studies furthered under 4th degree Black belt, Roger McCollough of Choi's Academy in Chicago, Illinois. Christensen last studied Martial Arts under Mario Urso from the Degerberg Academy in Chicago, Illinois.

He currently resides in Marriottsville, Maryland.

Elevator Constructors Local 2 political offices, achievements and awards
Christensen joined the Elevator Constructors in 1979 and served as a member of the executive board and as vice-president of Local 2 from 1994 to 1998. In 1998, he became president of Local 2 and served in this office until his appointment as business manager on September 15, 2001. He won the November 20, 2001 Special Election as business manager and has been re-elected to full three-year terms in 2002, 2005, 2008 and 2011. In 2005, Christensen was selected as the Illinois Maritime Labor Man of the Year. In the 2011 General Election, Christensen ran unopposed and became the longest-serving business manager of Elevator Constructors Local 2 in its 114-year history. Christensen also served as a director of the Italian American Labor Council and was a member on several local and state labor councils. Christensen was a former member of the National American Society of Mechanical Engineers A17.1 Committee and was also instrumental in the creation of the first nationwide Qualified Elevator Inspection (QEI) testing program.

Christensen while business manager was a tireless crusader in protecting the work jurisdiction for his members. In 2007 and 2008 he achieved landmark rulings at both the NLRB and in Federal District Court. In 2006, Christensen fought to protect the union's work jurisdiction over hiring practices; as a result, Christensen was personally named in three lawsuits along with Elevator Constructors Local 2, which was filed by three of the four major elevator manufacturers. In the ensuing court case, a settlement conference was conviened in January 2007 and Christensen won several major concessions from the manufacturers which today has become the blueprint for future labor negotiations not only for the IUEC; but for other trade unions worldwide as well.
Christensen also achieved a landmark NLRB 10-K ruling in 2008 against Ironworkers Local 63 which would have devastated the Elevator Constructors not only in Chicago but nationwide.

Christensen has been a member of the Italian American Labor Council since 2001. In 2014 he received the Italian American Labor Man-of-the-Year award.

In 2015 Christensen received the NOVA labor of Excellence in Leadership Award in Virginia.

In 2016, Christensen received 2016 Labor Press Leadership Award in New York City. Also in 2016 he received a 127th District citation award from Andy King, New York city council member.

International political offices
In October 2003, Christensen was appointed international vice president by Elevator Constructors General President Dana Brigham. At the 2011 International General Convention on August 31, 2011, he was elected first vice president of the International Union of Elevator Constructors. On December 18, 2011, Christensen received a prestigious International appointment as a trustee to the National Elevator Industry Educational Program by IUEC General President Dana Brigham. On September 11, 2012, Christensen was elected unanimously by the general executive board to replace the retiring Dana Brigham as general president. Christensen currently represents all Elevator Constructors throughout the world on two Labor Boards, The Global Conference Board and the Industrial for All Board.

General president of the International Union of Elevator Constructors
In May 2012, Christensen launched an investigation into the financial inconsistencies at the International. Christensen was encouraged by a few of the vice presidents and a handful of business managers throughout the International to run for general president. Christensen accepted the nomination and promised greater transparency and to curb unnecessary spending at the International. He also pledged to put in financial safeguards, return democracy to the union and to protect the rights of the individual union members. On September 11, 2012 the general executive board elected Christensen unanimously to become the 15th general president. In December 2012, Christensen was selected as a vice president of the Building and Construction Trades Department of the AFL-CIO.

Christensen was granted unprecedented powers by the rank and file of the Elevator Constructors in February 2013. They voted overwhelmingly to approve the appointment of three trustees to investigate the financial records of the previous international officers and to give Christensen the ability to utilize the trustees to investigate the financial records of any local union within the International as he deems necessary. The rank and file also voted to allow Christensen to appoint two new International Vice Presidents which allows him to solidify his power base.

On March 14, 2013, a "Salute to Frank Christensen" was given in Itasca, Illinois. The evening was a tribute to Christensen's many achievements as a labor leader, humanitarian and as a political force in the United States and Canada. In attendance was a Who's Who in the worlds of politics, labor and business. Many tributes were given denoting Christensen's dynamic leadership as a labor leader, state official and mediator which has allowed him to transcend his prominence across the labor, business and political spectrum. 
In July, 2016 Christensen was unanimously elected to a full five-year term as general president.

Secretary of Labor nominee and national offices
With the resignation of Labor Secretary Hilda Solis in January 2013, Christensen's name has surfaced online as a possible successor, and it is rumored that his name is on a short list of nominees. President Obama nominated Thomas Perez on March 18, 2013. Christensen's name may resurface if Perez's nomination falters and there may be other cabinet-level positions offered or an ambassadorship. Many are asking Christensen to seek the Democratic nomination to become the next United States Senator from Illinois, replacing Mark Kirk and recapturing Barack Obama's senate seat for the democrats.

Donations and charitable events
Christensen is active in several charities, through his efforts he has raised tens of thousands of dollars for these worthy causes and has won numerous awards for his service to others. Christensen is a strong advocate for the Special Olympics and has been a local organizer and participant in Polar Plunge since 2003. The other charitable organizations he participates and raises funds include: DAD's Day (Dollars against Diabetes) and the Green Ribbon Rally that benefits the Walter Payton Liver Center at the University of Illinois Medical Center and the Jesse Brown Chicago VA Medical Center. Since 2009, he has organized several charitable functions to raise money for the unemployed members and their families, including Christmas parties, Texas Hold 'em Poker Tournaments and a Comedy Night. In 2017 Christensen received a citation of appreciation from the "Toybox Connection" (a charity that gives toys to children wherever needed and helps with building supplies for people struggling from floods, fire or natural disasters.)

Appointments as a State of Illinois official
In July 2003, he was appointed as the first chairman of the Illinois Elevator Safety Board by Governor Rod Blagojevich and was reappointed as Chairman in 2007. On September 2, 2009 Governor Pat Quinn reappointed Christensen as Chairman and extended his term to 2013.

Illinois Elevator Safety Board
The Associated Press broke a story on September 4, 2009, concerning the reappointment of a union official to a state board. On September 2, 2009, Illinois Governor Pat Quinn reappointed Christensen as the chairman of the Illinois Elevator Board in the Labor position reserved for Cook County. Previously Christensen had served on the Elevator Board as a representative for a municipality with a population between 25,000 and 50,000. Christensen's term as head of the Elevator Safety Review Board wouldn't have expired until 2011, but Quinn gave him a new term that extends his appointment to 2013.

The Associated Press had reported in 2008 that his union donated $10,000 to Blagojevich in July 2003, around the time Christensen and another Local 2 member were appointed to the panel that is revamping elevator construction and maintenance rules which could mean more jobs for installers. Christensen has not been accused of wrongdoing. Although not accused of wrongdoing, it has cause unrest in the Chicago union which is still debated openly online today over the contribution. It has generated a debate with 7000 plus comments over this "donation" when the article appeared online with Topix.

Christensen has maintained there was no link between the $10,000 contribution and the two board appointments. The other two member has since left the panel. "There was nothing meant by it," Christensen said this week. "Any guy running for governor that is labor friendly, if it's a Republican or a Democrat, we would have donated to them." But no other contribution from Local 2 comes close to that amount, according to state campaign finance records. Christensen explained that by saying the union's political action committee had sufficient funds at the time and "when you've got the money, you give what you can."

The Associated Press also reported that a federal judge ruled in 2007, however, that the union improperly retaliated against three of its members for disagreeing with Christensen in his role as chairman of the elevator board. Christensen denies that was the case. According to the Associated Press, a lawsuit brought by Local 2 members, a federal judge declared in May 2007 that the union wrongly disciplined the members and declared one ineligible to run for election as a union officer. District Court Judge George Lindberg found that the union took "retaliatory disciplinary actions" against the members for disagreeing about proposed elevator-safety rules with Christensen, who was acting in his role as elevator board chairman. Christensen said the ruling was by an anti-labor judge and that an earlier National Labor Relations Board ruling upheld Local 2's decision on the election eligibility.

After leaving the position in February 2013, Christensen was awarded a certificate of appreciation from the Illinois Fire Marshals office for 10 years of dedicated service.

Civil cases against the United States Department of Labor

According to Federal Court records, the United States Department of Labor filed a lawsuit (08-cv-1595) against Elevator Constructors Local 2 in Illinois Northern Federal District Court for other statues and miscellaneous reasons on March 18, 2008. The case was heard by Federal District Court Judge John F. Grady, a former Chief Judge. The lawsuit was filed by United States Attorney Patrick Fitzgerald on behalf of the United States Department of Labor asking the Court to have Elevator Constructors Local 2 comply with the Department of Labor Subpoena Duces Tecum filed on April 24, 2007 for various records and documents in connection with an investigation to determine whether any person has violated or is about to violate the Labor Management Reporting and Disclosure Act of 1959.

From Elevator Constructors Local 2's Website; a letter dated May 19, 2008 written by the Union Attorney, claims the subpoena request was contrary to the Department of Labor's long-standing policy of auditing Local Unions in the office of the Union in order to avoid unwarranted intrusion in the affairs of the local and that the Department of Labor took their actions solely as a means of harassing Local 2 and interfering with its operations. The Department of Labor wanted to compel Local 2 to produce originals of all its records at the Department of Labor's Office in May 2007. According to the Union Attorney, the Department of Labor never responded to Local 2's offer to comply with the Local's request to review the records at the Local's Office. On July 9, 2008 Federal District Court Judge John F. Grady ordered an evidentiary hearing for July 23, 2008 which was later rescheduled for July 30, 2008.

On July 30, 2008 in Federal District Court in Chicago, Elevator Constructors Local 2 agreed to comply with the demands of the Department of Labor Subpoena Duces Tecum and agreed to transfer the requested records, documents and computer files to the Department of Labor by November 12, 2008. On January 14, 2009 in Federal District Court, the Department of Labor said that Elevator Constructors Local 2 was in compliance with its subpoena and Federal Judge John F. Grady dismissed the case with prejudice.

FOIA lawsuits against and victory over the US Department of Labor
On January 19, 2009, Local 2 and Frank Christensen filed a lawsuit against the Department of Labor in Federal District Court in Chicago (09-cv-326) asking for the release of documents being withheld by the Department of Labor pursuant to the Freedom of Information Act (FOIA). On September 29, 2009, this lawsuit was voluntarily dismissed without prejudice by Elevator Constructors Local 2 and Frank Christensen. On January 13, 2010, the Plaintiffs; Frank Christensen and Elevator Constructors Local 2, filed a motion in Federal District Court to reinstate the lawsuit on the grounds that the Department of Labor failed to either produce the required documents or deny the appeal in a timely manner. On April 27, 2010 Judge Ruben Castillo ruled that he would not reinstate the case.

On March 26, 2010, Elevator Constructors Local 2 and Frank Christensen filed a second lawsuit in United States Federal District Court against the United States Department of Labor (10-cv-1935) asking for the release of documents being withheld. The complaint asked the Court to prevent the DOL from withholding public documents pursuant to the Freedom of Information Act. According to Court Documents the DOL is withholding approximately 4,100 pages of responsive material. The United States Department of Labor initially reported that they were withholding the 4100 pages due to FOIA Exemption 7(A). On April 29, 2011 the DOL acknowledged that 3,900 pages of documents are being withheld from the plaintiffs. The FOIA consists of approximately 750 documents, which are contained within the following categories; correspondence: 320 documents; witness and informant statements: 178 documents; internal memoranda: 153 documents; Union documents and reports: 87 documents; Court filings: 12 documents; and newspaper articles: 1 document. The DOL asserts "Exemption 7(A) to justify its withholding of the responsive materials. Exemption 7(A) permits an agency to withhold information contained in files compiled for law enforcement purposes if production "could reasonably be expected to interfere with enforcement proceedings."

On June 6, 2011, when Federal District Court Judge Ruben Castillo ruled that the Department of Labor's boilerplate justifications were not sufficient to meet the burden of invoking FOIA Exemption 7(A). That the Court defers resolution of the parties' cross-motion for summary judgement and orders the Department of Labor to submit declarations that meet the criteria and the withheld documents are to be submitted for an "in camera" review. The Department of Labor was ordered to provide the withheld documents for review by the Court and provide the Court with a specific and detailed Declaration stating the reasons why the documents were being withheld per Exemption 7(A) by July 7, 2011.

On August 17, 2011, United States District Court Judge Ruben Castillo ruled in favor of the United States Department of Labor's motion for summary judgment and denied the Elevator Constructors Local 2 and Frank Christensen's motion for disclosure of the withheld documents. The case was dismissed with prejudice and Elevator Constructors Local 2 did not file an appeal. On June 26, 2012 the Department of Labor concluded their investigation against the officers and the local.

References and footnotes

External links
 Ironworkers Local 63 v Elevator Constructors Local 2
 Frank Christensen's Letter to Membership
 Local 2 Labor Attorneys Respond to False Allegations presented by a member of the Executive Board at a meeting.
  pdf of letter by Whitfield & McGann to Members of Local 2
 - Today in History (1961)
 - Celebrities Who.com
 - The Lounge at MovieCodec
 Union Elevator Safety Board positions by State
 Elevator Industry Work Preservation Fund - Model Code Law
 Elevator Industry Work Preservation Fund Website
 
 
 International Union of Elevator Constructors Local 2
 The Office of the Illinois State Fire Marshal - OSFM

1961 births
American trade union leaders
Illinois Democrats
Living people
Iowa State University alumni
University of Wisconsin–Madison alumni
People from Tinley Park, Illinois
People from Chicago
People from Howard County, Maryland
Chicago-Kent College of Law alumni